Cheshmeh Pahn-e Rashid (also Romanized as Cheshmeh Pahn-e Rashīd and Cheshmeh Pahn Rashīd) is a village in Cheleh Rural District, in the Central District of Gilan-e Gharb County, Kermanshah Province, Iran. At the 2006 census, its population was 161, in 36 families.

References 

Populated places in Gilan-e Gharb County